The Lancia 20/30 HP (Tipo 58), later known as Lancia Epsilon, is a passenger car produced by Italian car manufacturer Lancia between 1911 and 1912. The car was quite similar to the previous 20/30 HP Delta model. In total 357 were made.

Models
Three wheelbase lengths were offered, resulting in a choice of five different models—depending on the desired body style:

 Type A: normal wheelbase, for phaetons, landaulets, limousines and coupés
 Type B: long wheelbase, for phaetons, landaulets and limousines
 Type C: short wheelbase Corsa, for competition two- or three-seaters
 Type D: normal wheelbase, for torpedoes
 Type E: long wheelbase, for torpedoes and cabriolets

Specifications
The Epsilon was powered by a Tipo 58 side valve monobloc inline-four, displacing 4,080 cc, which produced 60 hp at 1,500 rpm.

The separate body was built on a ladder frame; front and rear there were solid axles on semi-elliptic springs at the front and three-quarter elliptic springs at the rear. The brakes were on the transmission and on the rear wheels. The transmission was a 4-speed gearbox with a multi-plate wet clutch.

Notes

References

Bibliography

 

Epsilon
Cars introduced in 1911
Brass Era vehicles